Maria Rosa Coccia (4 January 1759 – November 1833) was an Italian harpsichordist and composer.

Life
Maria Rosa Coccia was born in Rome and studied with Sante Pesci. At the age of 13, Coccia composed six sonatas for harpsichord and the oratorio Daniello, which was performed the same year in the Oratory S. Filippo Neri, in defiance of a tradition that women were not allowed to attend the event.

In 1716 Pope Clement XI had decreed that anyone practicing music in Rome must enter the Accademia di Santa Cecilia and pass the exam to become Maestro di Capella. At 16 Coccia passed the exam and received the title, but because of her gender was never allowed to execute the duties of the position, though her music was performed. As a practicing composer, she was admitted to Rome's Accademia de' Forti.

In 1780 Maestro di Cappella Francesco Capalti of Narni Cathedral attacked Coccia's examination composition and her receipt of the title. She was defended by Michele Mallio in his Elogio storico della signora Maria Rosa Coccia romana (Rome, 1780), containing letters of support from Metastasio, Carlo Broschi  and Giovanni Battista Martini. Pasquale Antonio Basili in 1784 published an open letter in defense of Coccia and against criticism of Capalti.

Maria Rosa Coccia died in Rome.

Works
Selected works include:
Six Sonatas for harpsichord
Daniello nel lago dei leoni, oratorio in two parts, Rome, Chiesa Nuova, 1772, lost
L'isola disabitata (P. Metastasio), 1772, lost
Hic vir despiciens mundum, fugue, 4 voices, Rome, 1774 (examination piece for Congregazione di S Cecilia, and Accademia Filarmonica, Bologna)
Magnificat, Soprano voice, Contralto voice, organ, 1774
Dixit Dominus, 8 voices, organ, 1775 (may be same as Dixit Dominus, 8 voices, violin, viola, oboe, flute, horn)
Il trionfo d'Enea, cantata in two parts, Soprano voice, Soprano voice, Contralto voice, Tenor voice, violin, viola, horn, trumpet, oboe, contrabbasso, basso continuo, ?1779
Ifigenia, cantata, 2 sopranos, orchestra, 1779, composed for the Princess Maria Luisa of Bourbon-Parma
Arsinoe, cantata, 4 voices, orchestra, 1783
Confitebor, Soprano voice, Soprano voice, organ
‘Qualche lagrime spargete’ from Semiramide, lost
Salve Regina, 2 voices, organ, n.d.
Veni Creator Spiritus, 4 voices, organ
4 psalms, lost

References

External links
Project Continua: Biography of Maria Rosa Coccia  Project Continua is a web-based multimedia resource dedicated to the creation and preservation of women's intellectual history from the earliest surviving evidence into the 21st Century.
 

1759 births
1833 deaths
18th-century Italian composers
Women classical composers
Musicians from Rome
18th-century women composers